Gollin is a surname. Notable people with this name include:

Alfred Gollin (1926-2005), American scholar of European history. 
George Gollin (born 1953), American physics professor at the University of Illinois
Fabrizio Gollin (born 1975), Italian racing car driver
Rita K. Gollin (born 1928), Professor of English at the State University of New York, an authority on Nathaniel Hawthorne
Walter J. Gollin (1854–1927), Australian businessman, co-founder of merchants Gollin & Co
Other uses
Gollin figure test is a psychologists' memory test

References